The Belgian railway line 59 is a railway line in Belgium connecting Antwerp with Ghent. It was opened between 1844 and 1847. Until 1970, the eastern terminus of the railway was a station on the left bank of the river Scheldt, opposite the city centre of Antwerp. Since 1970, the railway is connected to Antwerp central station by a rail tunnel under the Scheldt. The total length of the line between Antwerpen-Berchem and Gent-Dampoort (the section between Gent-Dampoort and Gent-Sint-Pieters is part of line 58 Ghent – Eeklo) is 55.8 km.

Stations
The main interchange stations on line 59 are:

Antwerpen-Berchem: to Antwerp, Roosendaal, Lier and Brussels 
Sint-Niklaas: to Mechelen
Lokeren: to Dendermonde
Gent-Dampoort: to Gent-Sint-Pieters and Eeklo

References

59